Language: Introductory Readings is a textbook edited by Paul Eschholz, Alfred Rosa and Virginia Clark in which the authors provide an introduction to linguistics. It is described as a well-known introductory text in linguistics.

References

External links 
 Language: Introductory Readings

1972 non-fiction books
Linguistics textbooks
Edited volumes
Macmillan Publishers books